Nemophora augantha is a moth of the family Adelidae or fairy longhorn moths. It was described by Edward Meyrick in 1907. It is found in Assam, India.

References

Adelidae
Moths described in 1907
Moths of Asia